Miguel Arribas (ca. 1811 – ca. 1891) was Mayor of Ponce, Puerto Rico, from 28 July 1871 to 31 December 1871.

See also

 List of Puerto Ricans
 List of mayors of Ponce, Puerto Rico

References

Further reading
 Ramon Marin. Las Fiestas Populares de Ponce. Editorial Universidad de Puerto Rico. 1994.

External links
 Guardia Civil española (c. 1898) (Includes military ranks in 1880s Spanish Empire.)

Mayors of Ponce, Puerto Rico
1810s births
1890s deaths
Year of death uncertain
Year of birth uncertain